(born 5 February 1982) (originally named Tetsuya Katsu 勝哲也) is a Japanese actor and model born in Osaka, Japan. He won the grand prix at a Men's Non-no model audition. Afterwards, he moved to Tokyo from Osaka and started his modelling career. He is known for modeling in Rudo (Japanese magazine), Zozo Town,<ref>[http://zozo.jp/modellist2/default.htmlZOZO Model List]</ref> and Tokyo collection. Recently he expanded his career from modeling to acting.  His trademark is his black long hair.

Filmography
Film
 Fashion Story: Model (2012)
 Bright Audition (2014)

Short Film
 ame soeur(2013)
 Ogori no Haru(2013)
 大展望 Teyaman (2013)

Television dramas
MTV Shibuhara Girls2''
NHK BS premium Cambrian Wars
BeeTV Mitsu-Fechi

References

External links 
Agency website

1982 births
Living people
Japanese male models
Japanese male film actors
Japanese male television actors